Geghanush is a village in the Kapan Municipality of the Syunik Province in Armenia.

Demographics 
The Statistical Committee of Armenia reported the community's population as 286 in 2010, down from 356 at the 2001 census. The village's population was 253 at the 2011 census, down from 280 at the 2001 census.

References 

Populated places in Syunik Province